Dietrich of Meissen refers to:
Dietrich I, Margrave of Meissen (ruled 1198–1221)
Dietrich II, Margrave of Meissen (ruled 1291–1307), see List of margravines of Meissen